William Mastrosimone (born August 19, 1947) is an American playwright and screenwriter from Trenton, New Jersey. He attended high school at The Pennington School and received a graduate degree in playwriting from Mason Gross School of the Arts, a part of Rutgers University.

His plays include The Woolgatherer, Extremities, Shivaree, and Cat's Paw. He also wrote Bang Bang You're Dead, which was once able to be downloaded from the Internet and performed by students for free.  Other plays include The Afghan Women and Nanawatai, upon which the film The Beast is based. Two recent plays are Sleepwalk, a story again focusing on the traumas of modern teenage life, and "Dirty Business", a play about a party girl caught between the mafia and the newly elected President of the United States.

Mastrosimone's first play was The Woolgatherer which premiered at Rutgers Theatre Company in New Jersey of 1979

His screenwriting credits include, With Honors, Into the West and the adaptation of his play Extremities. He won 2 Daytime Emmy Awards for Bang, Bang You're Dead and was nominated for a Prime Time Emmy for Into the West and The Burning Season.

His play Bang Bang You're Dead is being toured by 'Playground Theatre Project' with students from Actor's Playground School of Theatre (in NJ), directed by Ralph Colombino, based in the Tri-State Area. This company goes to middle schools, high schools, and universities to prevent violence.

External links
Icarus Plays
Bang Bang You're Dead

1947 births
Living people
20th-century American dramatists and playwrights
20th-century American male writers
20th-century American screenwriters
21st-century American dramatists and playwrights
21st-century American male writers
21st-century American screenwriters
American male dramatists and playwrights
American male screenwriters
American male television writers
American television writers
The Pennington School alumni
Rutgers University alumni
Screenwriters from New Jersey
Writers from Trenton, New Jersey